The 49th Street station is a local station on the BMT Broadway Line of the New York City Subway. Located at West 49th Street and Seventh Avenue in Midtown Manhattan, it is served by the N train at all times, the R train at all times except late nights, the W train on weekdays, and the Q train during late nights.

Station layout

This underground station, opened on July 10, 1919, has four tracks and two side platforms. The two center express tracks are used by the Q train at all times except late nights.

The station was operated by the BMT until the city government took over the BMT's operations on June 1, 1940. 49th Street was originally built in the same style as the other BMT Broadway stations. The station underwent an experimental renovation in October 1973. New tiling of red glazed brick was installed over the original BMT-style tiled walls, reducing the platforms' widths by several inches; in addition, special ceiling soundproofing and terrazzo flooring were installed. Since the renovation, three of the four street entrances have been reconstructed, leaving only the 47th Street exit on the southbound platform with the red brick appearance; additionally, the soundproofing experiment was not repeated at any other station. Additional false brick tiles were added some time after the 1973 renovation, indicating the presence of a station facility. A passageway leading to an exit at West 47th Street and Broadway was also added after the renovation. Also, one of the staircases on the southbound side is walled off, making only one staircase available to the southbound side. Yellow tactile treads on both platforms' edges were installed in 2015.

South of this station, the downtown local track descends slightly before ascending again. This is due to Broadway and Seventh Avenue intersecting at the narrow point of Times Square under 45th Street. As a result, the downtown local track of the BMT Broadway Line has to cross beneath the uptown local track of the IRT Broadway–Seventh Avenue Line.

Exits

There are four sets of platform-level fare controls, with no crossover or crossunder. Each platform has a full-time booth at the north end (49th Street) and a part-time booth at the south end (47th Street). Only the northbound platform is ADA-accessible. An elevator was constructed in conjunction with a new office tower at the northeast corner of West 49th Street and Seventh Avenue. The elevator conceals an out-of-system underground passageway leading to Rockefeller Center and the 47th–50th Streets station on the IND Sixth Avenue Line.
  One stair and one elevator, within 745 7th Avenue building, NE corner of 7th Avenue and 49th Street (northbound only)
 One stair, within 1626 Broadway building, NW corner of 7th Avenue and 49th Street (southbound only)
 One stair, on street, SW corner of 7th Avenue and 49th Street (southbound only)
 One stair, within Palace Theatre building, SE corner of 7th Avenue and 47th Street (northbound only)
 Two stairs, on street underneath 2 Times Square building, north side of 47th Street between Broadway and 7th Avenue (southbound only)

References

Further reading

External links 

 
 Station Reporter — N Train
 Station Reporter — R Train
 49th Street entrance from Google Maps Street View
 47th Street and Seventh Avenue entrance from Google Maps Street View
 47th Street and Broadway entrance from Google Maps Street View
 Platforms from Google Maps Street View

BMT Broadway Line stations
New York City Subway stations in Manhattan
Railway stations in the United States opened in 1919
Midtown Manhattan
Seventh Avenue (Manhattan)
1919 establishments in New York City